Lieutenant General Willem Hendrik Hechter  (born 26 May 1942, in East London) is a former Chief of the South African Air Force.

Military career
Hechter joined the SAAF in January 1960 and received his wings in December 1960 at Central Flying School, Dunnottar. He served as Officer Commanding Advanced Flying School, Pietersburg and 1 Squadron before serving as Staff Officer Fighters and Senior Staff Officer Fighters at Air Force Headquarters.

Hechter commanded AFB Pietersburg before serving as Director Force Preparation, Chief of Air Staff Operations and Chief of Air Staff. He was appointed Chief of the Air Force from 1 May 1996.

Aircraft flown
Hechter flew the following aircraft:
 Harvard
 De Havilland Vampire
 Impala
 Canadair Sabre Mk.6
 Mirage III
 Mirage F1CZ

Awards and decorations
Lt Gen Hechter was awarded the following:

References

|-

Chiefs of the South African Air Force
1942 births
People from East London, Eastern Cape
Living people